Walking Concert is an indie rock band from New York City, featuring Walter Schreifels on vocals and guitar; Jeffery E. Johnson on guitar; Ryan Stratton on bass guitar; and Drew Thomas on drums.

The band takes its name from the line "Boy, you're gonna be a Walking Concert!", spoken by a music store clerk to Ralph Macchio's character in the 1986 film, Crossroads.

Discography

Studio albums 
Run to Be Born 2004

External links 
Comprehensive listing of Walking Concert releases, shows, flyers and videos
Walking Concert official band site
Walking Concert at Some Records
Walter Schreifels official site
United by Walter a Walter Schreifels fan site

Indie rock musical groups from New York (state)
Musical groups established in 2003